The Moon Pool is a fantasy novel by American writer Abraham Merritt.  It originally appeared as two short stories in All-Story Weekly: "The Moon Pool" (1918) and its sequel, "Conquest of the Moon Pool" (1919).  These were then reworked into a novel released in 1919.  The protagonist, Dr. Goodwin, would later appear in Merritt's second novel The Metal Monster (1920).

Although Merritt did not invent the "lost world" novel—he followed in the footsteps of Bulwer-Lytton, Burroughs, Conan Doyle, and others—this work extended the tradition.

Plot summary
The plot concerns an advanced race which has developed within the Earth's core. Eventually their most intelligent members create an offspring. This created entity encompasses both great good and great evil, but it slowly turns away from its creators and towards evil. The entity is called either the Dweller or the Shining One.

Eventually, of the race which created it, only three are left; these are called the Silent Ones, and they have been 'purged of dross' and can be described as higher, nobler, more angelic beings than are humankind. They have also been sentenced by the good among their race to remain in the world, and not to die, as punishment for their pride which was the source of the calamity called the Dweller, until such time as they destroy their creation—if they still can. And the reason they do not do so is simply that they continue to love it.

The Dweller is in the habit of rising to the surface of the earth and capturing men and women whom it holds in an unholy stasis and who, in some ways, feed it. It increases its knowledge and power constantly, but has a weakness, since it knows nothing of love.
The scientist Dr. Goodwin and the half-Irish, half-American pilot Larry O'Keefe, and others, follow it down. Eventually they meet a woman, beautiful and evil, named Yolara, who in essence serves the Shining One, and the 'handmaiden' of the Silent Ones, beautiful and good, named Lakla. Both want O'Keefe and eventually battle over him.

There is also a race of very powerful and handsome Polynesian-like 'dwarves' and a race of humanoids whom the Silent Ones developed from a semi-sentient froglike species.

There develops a battle between the forces of good and evil with not only the entire world, but perhaps even the existence of good itself at stake. But can the forces of good prevail using fear as a weapon? Or will they have to rely upon love expressed by willing sacrifice?

Publication history
The book has been published a number of times:

 1919, US, G. P. Putnam's Sons, Pub date 1919
 1993, US. Carrol & Graf, "Masters of Fantasy" series 
 2001, US, University of Nebraska Press, Pub date 2001, Paperback, Bison Frontiers of Imagination series, with introduction by Robert Silverberg
 2004, US, Wesleyan University Press, Pub date 2002, the Wesleyan Early Classics of Science Fiction series, with introduction by Michael M. Levy
 2009, US, Overlook Press, Pub date 2009, with introduction by Lynnette Porter

Collections
"The Moon Pool" has been collected in numerous general anthologies, including Volume 2 of The Road to Science Fiction (the 2002 edition by Scarecrow Press only) and Book 1 of The Ancient Mysteries Reader by Peter Haining. The original story was reprinted in The Mammoth Book of Fantasy by Mike Ashley.

Reception

In its review of The Moon Pool, the New York Times called the novel "a shimmering, glittering web of imagination" and that "the author's energy and fertility of imaginative resources never seem to lessen."

Analog magazine considers The Moon Pool to be the author's "most celebrated novel".

Legacy
The Moon Pool is sometimes cited as an influence on "The Call of Cthulhu" by H.P. Lovecraft, which may in turn have itself influenced Merritt's later story Dwellers in the Mirage (especially the monster Khalk'ru). In particular, The Moon Pool is partly set on Nan Madol, a location which would, some claim, later inspire Lovecraft's R'lyeh.

Doug Skinner has highlighted Merritt's work, starting with The Moon Pool, as a major influence on the American writer and artist Richard Shaver:

Copyright
The copyright for this story has expired in the United States and, thus, now resides in the public domain there.  The text is available via Project Gutenberg.

See also
 Dweller of the Threshold

Notes

External links
 
 
Featured Review: The Moon Pool, the SF Site
 

1919 American novels
1919 fantasy novels
American fantasy novels
Lost world novels
Novels first published in serial form
Pohnpei
Science fantasy novels
Works originally published in Argosy (magazine)
Novels set in Oceania
Novels set on islands
Federated States of Micronesia culture
Avon (publisher) books